Jang-jorim is a Korean side dish consisting of eye of round beef braised in soy sauce with shisito peppers and eggs. Jang-jorim is a type of jorim, a Korean simmered dish that preserves well. The side dish is commonly packed in lunch boxes in South Korea and is sold at South Korean convenience stores as a lunchtime dish. The dish can also be made using shiitake mushrooms, quail eggs, and pork.

History 
The first known mention of jang-jorim is in Volume 128 of the Veritable Records of the Joseon Dynasty, where it describes a dish called damhae made by slicing beef and braising it in soy sauce.

Description 
The dish is made by simmering small chunks of lean beef first in water, skimming off any scum. Once the beef is cooked, the meat is simmered in soy sauce along with a mixture of garlic, ginger, and sugar. When served, the meat is shredded along the grain, and drizzled with the braising liquid to re-moisten the meat. The dish preserves well in the fridge, and is typically served cold with other side dishes.

See also 

 Korean cuisine
 Korean royal court cuisine

References 

Korean cuisine
Beef dishes
Korean beef dishes